Hormuridae is a family of scorpions in the order Scorpiones.  There are about 10 genera and more than 90 described species in Hormuridae.

Genera
These 11 genera belong to the family Hormuridae:
 Cheloctonus Pocock, 1892
 Chiromachetes Pocock, 1899
 Chiromachus Pocock, 1893
 Hadogenes Kraepelin, 1894
 Hormiops Fage, 1933
 Hormurus Thorell, 1876
 Iomachus Pocock, 1893
 Liocheles Sundevall, 1833
 Opisthacanthus Peters, 1861
 Palaeocheloctonus Lourenço, 1996
 Tibetiomachus Lourenço & Qi, 2006

References

Scorpion families
Hormuridae